The Bannu Brigade was formed after the 1903 reforms of the British Indian Army by Herbert Kitchener when he was Commander-in-Chief, India. The brigade was part of the Northern Army and deployed along the North West Frontier. In 1914 at the start of World War I the composition of the brigade was:

Commander Major General O’Donnell
25th Cavalry (Frontier Force)
33rd Punjabis
52nd Sikhs (Frontier Force)
55th Coke's Rifles (Frontier Force)
29 Mountain Battery

The brigade was involved in the Operations in the Tochi between November 1914 and March 1915 when it was commanded by Major-General Vere Bonamy Fane.

See also

 List of Indian Army Brigades in World War II

References

Sources

Brigades of India in World War I
Military units and formations established in 1903